The Kingman Miner is a local newspaper in Kingman, Arizona, owned by Western News & Info. It has a circulation of 8,030.

References

External links
  Kingman Daily Miner
 Profile at Western News&Info website
 

Mass media in Mohave County, Arizona
Newspapers published in Arizona
Daily newspapers published in the United States
Kingman, Arizona
Publications established in 1882
1882 establishments in Arizona Territory